Occidental and Vanguard was a weekly newspaper in San Francisco Bay Area between 1866 and 1868.

Editor Zachariah Montgomery had published 25 issues of the preceding The Occidental between Oct. 29, 1864 and April 15, 1865.

A year later, on April 15, 1866, he merged with the Democratic Sentinel to publish Occidental and Vanguard.  J.F. Linthicum become the editor in April 1867, and the newspaper was discontinued on March 20, 1868.

References

External links 
 The Occidental
 The Democratic sentinel
 Occidental and vanguard

Defunct newspapers published in California
Newspapers published in San Francisco
1866 establishments in California
1868 disestablishments in California
Weekly newspapers published in California